John Fallon Field is a 2,500-seat multi-purpose field in Albany, New York. It is home to the University at Albany ("UAlbany") Men's and Women's Great Danes lacrosse teams. The field opened in 2005, as UAlbany's lacrosse program has grown into one of the National power-house teams in Division I lacrosse. The current bleachers opened prior to the 2008–09 school year as temporary bleachers were used the previous seasons.

John Fallon Field is located east of "The Bubble" and the Physical Education building. The field has hosted the 2002, 2003 and 2007 America East Conference men's lacrosse championship in which the Great Danes earned two of their four NCAA Men's Lacrosse Championship bids (as of 2008). It also the venue for the women's lacrosse team, who have yet to earn the top seed and host their tournament, but have hosted the Gary Gait coached Syracuse Orange women's lacrosse team in 2008.

On June 12, 2010 hosted the Chicago Machine the Long Island Lizards there in a Major League Lacrosse game.

Due to growing popularity of lacrosse in the Capital Region, the first-ever men's lacrosse game was held at Bob Ford Field on April 18, 2015. It was the first time since March 10, 2007 that a top-10 matchup was held in the Capital District, with #4 UAlbany defeating #10 Delaware 13-7

References

External links
 John Fallon Field

College lacrosse venues in the United States
Lacrosse venues in New York (state)
Albany Great Danes men's lacrosse
Sports venues in Albany, New York
2005 establishments in New York (state)
Sports venues completed in 2005
Former Major League Lacrosse venues